Willowdale may refer to:

Communities

Canada
Alphabetically by province
Willowdale Estates, Alberta, a locality
Willowdale, Halifax, Nova Scotia, a subdivision
Willowdale, Pictou, Nova Scotia, a community
Willowdale, Toronto, Ontario, a neighborhood
Willowdale (electoral district), Toronto
Willowdale (provincial electoral district), Toronto
Ward 18 Willowdale, Toronto municipal electoral division
Rural Municipality of Willowdale No. 153, Saskatchewan

United States
Alphabetically by state
Willowdale, Kansas, an unincorporated community in Kingman County
Willowdale Township, Dickinson County, Kansas, a township
Willowdale Township, Holt County, Nebraska, a township
Willowdale Settlement, New Hampshire, a former village; see 
Willowdale, New Jersey, a neighborhood in Cherry Hill
Willowdale, Pennsylvania, an unincorporated community
Willowdale, West Virginia, an unincorporated community

Historic buildings
Willowdale (Painter, Virginia), added to the National Register of Historic Places in 2007
Willowdale Estate, in Topsfield, Massachusetts

Other uses
Willowdale Airfield, in Toronto, Ontario, Canada
Willowdale Elementary School, in Omaha, Nebraska, U.S.

See also

Willow Vale (disambiguation)